Tuerkayana is a genus of large land crabs. It was created from two members of the genus Cardisoma and two members of Discoplax in late 2018 after a re-examination of the taxonomy of the family Gecarcinidae. Said re-examination also resulted in the creation of the new family Leptograpsodidae for the genus Leptograpsodes.

Species 
The genus Tuerkayana comprises these four species:

 Tuerkayana celeste (Ng & Guinot, 2001) (formerly Discoplax)
 Tuerkayana hirtipes (Dana, 1851) (formerly Cardisoma)
 Tuerkayana magnum (Ng & Shih, 2015) (formerly Discoplax)
 Tuerkayana rotundum (Quay & Gaimard, 1824) (formerly Cardisoma)

References

External links 

 
 

Grapsoidea
Terrestrial crustaceans
Decapod genera